The New Berlin Trail (or New Berlin Recreation Trail) is a  shared-use path in New Berlin, Wisconsin. It follows a former interurban route and a set of We Energies power lines.

History 
The railroad lining the trail was constructed in 1898 by The Milwaukee Electric Railway and Light Company as part of a Milwaukee-Waukesha interurban route, then fell into disuse in 1951.

Planning for the trail began in 1973, though construction did not begin until the fall of 1983. The trail was dedicated on May 19, 1984. The trail was paved in June 2006.

In 2020, the trail was designated part of U.S. Bicycle Route 30.

Route 
The trail runs from Lincoln Avenue in the City of Waukesha in the west to 124th Street at the Waukesha County-Milwaukee County border in the east, where it connects with the Oak Leaf Trail and the West Allis Cross-Town Connector.

References 

Rail trails in Wisconsin